Geothermal energy in Romania is mainly located, in the western part of the country, in the Banat region and the western part of the Apuseni Mountains with the most important source located in the Bihor County especially around the city of Oradea, that has been using geothermal energy for more than a hundred years. Theoretically Romania has the third highest potential geothermal capacity in Europe after Greece and Italy.

The direct-use heating has been mostly district heating serving 5,500 residences in Oradea and the city of Beiuş is the only city in Romania entirely heated by geothermal energy.

See also 
 Energy in Romania
 Wind power in Romania
 Solar power in Romania
 Hydroelectricity in Romania
 Renewable energy by country

References 

Geothermal energy in Romania